2895 Memnon  is a dark Jupiter trojan from the Trojan camp, approximately  in diameter. It was discovered on 10 January 1981, by American astronomer Norman Thomas at Lowell's Anderson Mesa Station near Flagstaff, Arizona, in the United States. The assumed C-type asteroid has a rotation period of 7.5 hours and belongs to the 80 largest Jupiter trojans. It was named after King Memnon from Greek mythology.

Orbit and classification 

Memnon is a Jovian asteroid located in the  Lagrangian point, 60° behind on Jupiter's orbit in the so-called Trojan camp . It is also a non-family asteroid of the Jovian background population.

It orbits the Sun at a distance of 5.0–5.5 AU once every 12 years (4,382 days; semi-major axis of 5.24 AU). Its orbit has an eccentricity of 0.05 and an inclination of 27° with respect to the ecliptic. The body's observation arc begins with a precovery taken at the Australian Siding Spring Observatory in December 1977, more than 3 years prior to its official discovery observation.

Physical characteristics 

Memnon has been characterized as a carbonaceous C-type asteroid. Its V–I color index of 0.71 is also lower than that of most larger Jupiter trojans, which are typically D-type asteroids.

Lightcurves 

A first rotational lightcurve of Memnon was obtained by American astronomer Richard Binzel in the early 1980s. It gave a rotation period of 7.5 hours with a brightness variation of 0.24 magnitude. In February 2005, a fragmentary lightcurve by Italian astronomer Federico Manzini at the Sozzago Astronomical Station  gave a period of 7 hours.

The so-far best rated lightcurve was obtained in November 1990, by Italian astronomer Stefano Mottola using the ESO 1-metre telescope at the La Silla Observatory in northern Chile. Analysis gave a period of  hours with an amplitude of 0.22 magnitude.

Between 2015 and 2018, photometric observations by Daniel Coley and Robert Stephens at the Center for Solar System Studies in Landers  obtained several concurring periods with a brightness variation of 0.33 and 0.08, respectively,

Diameter and albedo 

According to the survey carried out by NASA's Wide-field Infrared Survey Explorer with its subsequent NEOWISE mission, Memnon measures 56.70 kilometers in diameter, and its surface has an albedo of 0.060, while the Collaborative Asteroid Lightcurve Link assumes a standard albedo for a carbonaceous asteroid of 0.057 and calculates a diameter of 55.67 kilometers with an absolute magnitude of 10.0.

Naming 

This minor planet was named from Greek mythology after Memnon, the king of Ethiopia and nephew of King Priam of Troy. He supported the Trojan side in the Trojan War with 10,000 men and was killed in combat by the Greek hero Achilles. The official naming citation was published by the Minor Planet Center on 20 December 1983.

Notes

References

External links 
 Asteroid Lightcurve Database (LCDB), query form (info )
 Dictionary of Minor Planet Names, Google books
 Asteroids and comets rotation curves, CdR – Observatoire de Genève, Raoul Behrend
 Discovery Circumstances: Numbered Minor Planets (1)-(5000) – Minor Planet Center
 Asteroid 2895 Memnon at the Small Bodies Data Ferret
 
 

002895
Discoveries by Norman G. Thomas
Named minor planets
19810110